Glenning Valley is a suburb of the Central Coast region of New South Wales, Australia, located between The Entrance and Wyong. It is part of the  local government area. Virginia Giuffre, a prominent victim of the paedophile Jeffrey Epstein, lived in the suburb for eleven years.

References

Suburbs of the Central Coast (New South Wales)